Lady Margaret Frances Domville (née St Lawrence; 1840 – 9 January 1929) was an Irish aristocrat and a writer. She was also the daughter of the 3rd Earl of Howth and the wife of Sir Charles Compton Domville, 2nd Bt.

Biography
Lady Margaret Frances St Lawrence was born in 1840 to Thomas St Lawrence, 3rd Earl of Howth, and his wife, Lady Emily de Burgh, who was the daughter of the John de Burgh, 13th Earl of Clanricarde. Lady Emily died of measles in 1842 in Dublin.

Lady Margaret was raised a Protestant but converted to Catholicism. She was a regular contributor to periodicals and magazines, and wrote two books. She wrote predominantly about history and religion.

She married Sir Charles Compton William Domvile, 2nd Baronet Domvile, of Templeogue and Santry, on 20 June 1861. The couple had no children and were the last of the Domville family to live in Santry estate. Sir Charles died on 10 July 1884.

Works

Articles
 "A Visit to the Hareem of Saïd Pacha", Once a Week magazine, 1862
 "Sicilian Notes", Once a Week magazine, 1863
 "Eucharistic Adaptations of Holy Scripture: The Pharisee and the Publican" in The Irish Monthly, I (1873), pp. 39–40

Books
 A Life of Lamartine (1888)
 The King's Mother: Memoirs of Margaret Beaufort, Countess of Richmond and Derby (1899)

External links 
 The Catholic Who's who

References and sources

1840 births
1929 deaths
19th-century Irish women writers
Daughters of Irish earls
Wives of baronets